Rocknest 3 is a rock on the surface of Aeolis Palus, between Peace Vallis and Aeolis Mons (Mount Sharp), in Gale crater on the planet Mars.  The approximate site coordinates are: .
 
The rock was encountered at Rocknest by the Curiosity rover on its way from Bradbury Landing to the Point Lake overlook while traveling toward Glenelg Intrigue in October 2012.

See also
 

 Aeolis quadrangle 
 Composition of Mars 
 Geology of Mars
 List of rocks on Mars
 Timeline of Mars Science Laboratory

References

External links
Curiosity Rover - Official Site

Aeolis quadrangle
Mars Science Laboratory
Rocks on Mars